Minuscule 169 (in the Gregory-Aland numbering), ε 305 (Soden), is a Greek minuscule manuscript of the New Testament, on parchment. Palaeographically, it has been assigned  to the 11th century. It has marginalia.

Description 

The codex contains a complete text of the four Gospels on 252 parchment leaves (size ). The text is written in one column per page, in 19 lines per page, in light-brown ink. The large initial letters are written in gold.

There is also the Ammonian Sections (in Mark 233 sections, the last section in 16:8), with references to the Eusebian Canons (written below Ammonian Section numbers).

Text 

The Greek text of the codex is a representative of the Byzantine text-type. According to Hermann von Soden it is related to the Byzantine commentated text (Ak). Aland placed it in Category V.

According to the Claremont Profile Method it represents the textual family Kx in Luke 1 and Luke 20, with some relationship to cluster 1442. In Luke 10 no profile was made.

The pericope Pericope Adulterae (John 7:53-8:11) is omitted.

History 

The manuscript was once in the property of Achilles Statius, as also was minuscule 171.

It was examined by Bianchini, Birch (about 1782), and Scholz (1794-1852). C. R. Gregory saw it in 1886.

It is currently housed at the Biblioteca Vallicelliana (B. 133), at Rome.

See also 

 List of New Testament minuscules
 Biblical manuscript
 Textual criticism

References

Further reading 

 G. Bianchini, Evangeliarium quadruplex latinae versionis antiquae (Rome 1749), Teil 1, Bd. 2, S .530f.

Greek New Testament minuscules
11th-century biblical manuscripts